Ascheion was a city and polis (city-state) of ancient Achaea. 

It is mentioned in a decree from Delphi of the 4th century BCE awarding proxeny. A document is also preserved that two theorodokoi of Ascheion were named around 230-220 BCE to host the theoroi of Delphi.

References

Achaean city-states
Populated places in ancient Achaea
Former populated places in Greece
Lost ancient cities and towns